Kourouninkoto  is a small town and urban commune in the Cercle of Kita in the Kayes Region of south-western Mali.

Climate
The urban district has a Sudano Sahelian climate. The average annual rainfall is around 350 mm with nearly all of it falling between late June and mid September.

Hydrography
The town is watered by the river Baoulé located 20 km from the town. There are temporary streams during the rainy season.
There is a water purification plant in Kourouninkoto that provides potable water through a robine system.

Geography
Kourouninkoto is located in a valley surrounded by the Sokaroba mountain to the east, Kouroubonda mountain to the North, and Satankourou mountain to the west.

Population
In the 2009 census Kourouninkoto had a population of 5,335 inhabitants. This population consists of multiple ethnic groups; Malinke (majority), Bambara, Kakolos, Peulh, Sarakolé, Diawambé.

Economy
Kourouninkoto's economy is agriculture based. Farming is practiced by 96 percent of the workforce. Major crops are cotton, corn, millet, rice, and peanuts.

Transportation
The town is served by a large section of Regional Road 12. Transport vehicles leave daily from Kita to Kourouninkoto.

References

Communes of Kayes Region